AHJ is an extended play by American singer-songwriter, Albert Hammond Jr. The EP is produced by frequent The Strokes collaborator, Gus Oberg, and was recorded in Hammond's Broome St., Manhattan studio, as well as One Way Studios in upstate New York. It was released on October 8, 2013, and comprises five songs (though non-Cult Web Store digital versions omit "Carnal Cruise"). Hammond Jr. toured in support of the EP from October 2013 to 2014.

Track listing

References

2013 EPs
Albert Hammond Jr. albums
Cult Records EPs